The GW2.8TC is an engine developed and built by Great Wall Motor Company Ltd. in China with cooperation from Bosch. It is a 4 stroke, common rail diesel engine that produces  at 3600 rpm. It is used in the Great Wall Hover and the Great Wall Wingle. It is also China's first high-pressure common rail diesel engine.

References

Automobile engines